Robert Ismaël Kobla Malm (born 21 August 1973) is a former professional footballer who played as a striker. Born in France, he represented Togo at international level.

Club career
Malm was born in Dunkerque, France. In January 2008, he signed for Nîmes Olympique, formerly having terminated his contract with Montpellier HSC by mutual consent. On 24 August 2009, AS Cannes signed the Togolese forward from Nîmes on a two-year deal.

International career
Malm was a member of the Togo national team. He was called up to the 2006 World Cup.

References

External links

Living people
1973 births
Sportspeople from Dunkirk
Footballers from Hauts-de-France
Citizens of Togo through descent
Togolese footballers
French footballers
Association football forwards
Togo international footballers
2006 FIFA World Cup players
RC Lens players
USL Dunkerque players
USF Fécamp players
Stade Briochin players
FC Lorient players
Toulouse FC players
ASOA Valence players
FC Gueugnon players
Wasquehal Football players
Grenoble Foot 38 players
Stade Brestois 29 players
Montpellier HSC players
Nîmes Olympique players
AS Cannes players
Ligue 1 players
Ligue 2 players
Championnat National players
French sportspeople of Togolese descent